Christos Marathonitis (born 16 November 1998) is a Greek professional footballer who plays as a winger for Super League 2 club Panachaiki.

Honours
Ethnikos Achna
Cypriot Second Division: 2018–19

References

1998 births
Living people
Greek expatriate footballers
Football League (Greece) players
Cypriot Second Division players
Kallithea F.C. players
Ethnikos Achna FC players
Onisilos Sotira players
Association football wingers
Footballers from Athens
Greek footballers
Greek expatriate sportspeople in Cyprus
Expatriate footballers in Cyprus